The Malaysian Ceylonese Congress (MCC; ,) is a political party in Malaysia.

Formation
Formed earlier in 1958 as Malayan Ceylonese Congress before it changed its name to Malaysian Ceylonese Congress in 1970, the MCC was established as a political party. MCC was initially originated from Selangor Ceylonese Association or Persatuan Ceylon Selangor founded in 1900, when the meeting of its members under leadership of M.W. Navaratnam in January 1958 decided to transformed the association status to a political party by changing its name and constitution to Malayan Ceylonese Congress. The brainchild of M.W Navaratnam, MCC was formed to promote and preserve the Political, Educational, Social and Cultural aspects of the Malaysians of Ceylonese origin, or Sri Lankan descent. 

MCC was hoping to join the Barisan Nasional (BN) and its predecessor Alliance coalition since the independence in 1957 despite debates that the Malaysian Ceylonese community should join the Malaysian Indian Congress (MIC), one of BN's major component party for the Malaysian Indians instead. MCC used to have a Senator in the Dewan Negara; the Upper House of Parliament of Malaysia until 1981. 

Before the 2018 general election (GE14) which saw the fall of BN ruling government, MCC indirectly had been supporting the BN coalition and was considered to be pro-BN. MCC was inclined to BN when the coalition was in power and had received aid from the BN ruling government then.

President
To date, seven presidents have held office since 1958.

1) M. W. Navaratnam (1958–1969)
2) C. Sinnadurai (1970–1983)
3) Tan Sri V. Jeyaratnam (1983–1987)
4) N. Arumugasamy (1988–1995)
5) Prof. Datuk Dr D.M. Thuraiappah (1996-2003)
6) NKS Tharmaseelan (2004–2017)
7) Mahendranathan Thuraiappah (2018-)

See also
List of political parties in Malaysia
Politics of Malaysia
Barisan Nasional
Sri Lankan Tamil diaspora

External links

Official website (archive)
Malaysian Ceylonese Congress - HQ on Facebook
Malaysian Ceylonese Congress HQ Facebook Group
Malaysian Ceylonese Congress Youth Facebook
An Introduction to the Malaysian Ceylonese Community and the Malaysian Ceylonese Congress, by Dato' Dr. D.M. Thuraiappah, President of MCC, Penang Story
MALAYSIAN CEYLONESE CONGRESS Muar Blogspot
Ceylonese community receives RM2.5million aid

References

Political parties in Malaysia
Political parties established in 1958
1958 establishments in Malaya
Hindu political parties in Malaysia
Sri Lankan diaspora in Malaysia
Political parties of minorities
Conservative parties in Malaysia
Identity politics
Indian-Malaysian culture
Indian National Congress breakaway groups